Mary Warren (born Marie Elizabeth Wierman; November 6, 1893 – August 4, 1956), was an American silent film actress.

Early life 
Marie Elizabeth Wierman was born on November 6, 1893 in Philadelphia, the daughter of Mary E. Wierman (1871–1940).

Career 
In 1912, still using the name Marie Wierman, she was a member of the Lubin Stock Company, and worked on films in Maine. As Mary Warren, she was an actress based in Hollywood who appeared in about two dozen silent films between 1918 and 1924, including The Sea Panther (1918), The Vortex (1918), An Honest Man (1918), All Night (1918), What Every Woman Wants (1919), The Final Close-Up (1919), Girls (1919), Prudence on Broadway (1919), The City of Comrades (1919), The Prince of Avenue A (1920), Guile of Women (1921), Voices of the City (1921), Come on Over (1922), The Man Who Won (1923), The Wolf Man (1923), Cupid's Fireman (1923), and In Love with Love (1924). She also made one sound film, Irish Hearts (1934).

Personal life 
In 1916, Mary Warren married character actor Lee Phelps. They had two daughters, Marilee and Patricia. Lee Phelps died in 1953; Mary Warren died in 1956, aged 62 years, in Los Angeles, California.

References

External links 

 

1893 births
1956 deaths
American silent film actresses
Actresses from Philadelphia
20th-century American actresses